Făgetu may refer to several villages in Romania:

 Făgetu, a village in the town of Mioveni, Argeș County
 Făgetu, a village in Gura Foii Commune, Dâmboviţa County
 Făgetu, a village in Gura Vitioarei Commune, Prahova County
 Făgetu, a village in Plopiş Commune, Sălaj County
 Făgetu, a village in Nistorești Commune, Vrancea County

See also 
 Făget (disambiguation)
 Făgețel (disambiguation)